Remla is the main town of the Kerkennah Islands, Tunisia.  A three-day Octopus Festival in March marks the start of the octopus fishing season.

The sector had a population of 2623 as of Census 2014-04-23.

References

External links 
 Lexicorient

Populated places in Tunisia
Populated coastal places in Tunisia